Exilisia is a genus of moths in the family Erebidae. The genus was erected by Hervé de Toulgoët in 1958.

Species
 Exilisia andriai Toulgoët, 1955
 Exilisia bijuga Mabille, 1899
 Exilisia bilineata Toulgoët, 1954
 Exilisia bipuncta Hampson, 1900
 Exilisia butleri Toulgoët, 1958
 Exilisia contrasta Kühne, 2007
 Exilisia costimacula Toulgoët, 1958
 Exilisia disticha (Hampson, 1914)
 Exilisia falcata Toulgoët, 1954
 Exilisia flavicapilla Toulgoët, 1954
 Exilisia flavicincta Toulgoët, 1965
 Exilisia fletcheri Toulgoët, 1956
 Exilisia friederikeae Kühne, 2007
 Exilisia gablerinus Kühne, 2008
 Exilisia insularis Toulgoët, 1972
 Exilisia kruegeri Kühne, 2007
 Exilisia leighi Toulgoët, 1956
 Exilisia lichenaria Toulgoët, 1954
 Exilisia mabillei Toulgoët, 1958
 Exilisia marmorea Butler, 1882
 Exilisia mnigrum Mabille, 1899
 Exilisia nebulosa Toulgoët, 1958
 Exilisia obliterata Toulgoët, 1958
 Exilisia ocularis Toulgoët, 1953
 Exilisia olivascens Toulgoët, 1954
 Exilisia parvula Butler, 1882
 Exilisia perlucida Toulgoët, 1954
 Exilisia placida Butler, 1882
 Exilisia pluripunctata Mabille, 1900
 Exilisia prominentia Kühne, 2007
 Exilisia pseudomarmorea Toulgoët, 1958
 Exilisia pseudoplacida Toulgoët, 1958
 Exilisia punctata Hampson, 1900
 Exilisia quadripunctata Toulgoët, 1956
 Exilisia rufescens Toulgoët, 1958
 Exilisia subfusca Freyer, 1912
 Exilisia tripuncta (Kiriakoff, 1958)
 Exilisia variegata Toulgoët, 1972
 Exilisia viettei Toulgoët, 1958

References

Lithosiini